Kheri Sher Khan is a village in Kaithal district in Haryana, India. It is a part of the village Matour. It is the last village of Kaithal towards Jind. The population is about 3000.

Village features
Dada Khera
Large pond
Shiv Mandir
Kali Mandir
Baba Bhramchari Ka Dera
Peer Ka Dera
Water Supply
33KV power House
Bus Stand
Fertile land

Historical Well
Wide Street
Street Light
Antique Houses

Overview
Kheri Sher Khan is a small village located in Kaithal Tehsil of Kaithal district, Haryana with total 525 families residing. The Kheri Sherkhan village has population of 2787 of which 1476 are males while 1311 are females as per Population Census 2011.

In Kheri Sher Khan village population of children with age 0-6 is 354 which makes up 12.70 % of total population of village. Average Sex Ratio of Kheri Sharf ali village is 888 which is higher than Haryana state average of 879. Child Sex Ratio for the Kheri Sharf ali as per census is 893, higher than Haryana average of 834.

Kheri Sher Khan village has lower literacy rate compared to Haryana. In 2011, literacy rate of Kheri Sher Khan village was 69.75 % compared to 75.55 % of Haryana. In Kheri Sher Khan Male literacy stands at 80.84 % while female literacy rate was 57.26 %.

As per constitution of India and Panchyati Raaj Act, Kheri Sher Khan village is administrated by Sarpanch (Head of Village) who is elected representative of village.

Work Profile
In Kheri Sher Khan village out of total population, 1306 were engaged in work activities. 69.68 % of workers describe their work as Main Work (Employment or Earning more than 6 Months) while 30.32 % were involved in Marginal activity providing livelihood for less than 6 months. Of 1306 workers engaged in Main Work, 269 were cultivators (owner or co-owner) while 344 were Agricultural labourer.

Nearby villages of Kheri Sher Khan
 Mandi Kalan
 Chhatar
 Bhalang
 Kalasher
 Lodhar

References

Villages in Kaithal district